"Polish parliament" is an expression referring to the historical Polish parliaments (Sejm walny). It implies chaos and general disorder, and that no real decision can be reached during sessions. The term originates from the Swedish Polsk riksdag and German Polnischer reichstag, and exists in the languages of many Scandinavian and neighboring countries.

Every single member of the Polish parliament during the 17th and 18th century had an absolute veto; as a result, legislation could only be passed unanimously. Originally, the procedure was used for technical issues such as points of order, but as diverging interests discovered they could disrupt their opponents' agenda singlehandedly, the process came to be abused. Today, the expression is mostly used to describe an assembly that is too easy for minorities or individuals to disrupt and/or has too many parties present for meaningful and orderly debate and decision-making to take place.

See also 
 Hung parliament
 Kurultai
 Polish joke

References 

Phrases
English-language idioms
Anti-Polish sentiment